Maria Helena Souza Patto (born in Taubaté in 1942) is a Brazilian psychologist known for her work on school and educational psychology. She is an emerita professor at the Institute of Psychology of the University of São Paulo, having also served as the director of the Institute between 2004 and 2008.

She is mainly known for her research on school failure in Brazil, and her 1990 book A Produção do Fracasso Escolar ("The Production of School Failure") is considered a classic in Brazilian psychology.

References 

Brazilian women psychologists
Women psychologists
People from Taubaté
1942 births
Living people